Brooklyn Hebrew Maternity Hospital, which opened in 1921, was located at 1395 Eastern Parkway. This four-story building previously housed .

The hospital included "two separate kitchens to observe the dietary laws." Other features included:
 two delivery rooms
 one operating room
 space for twenty patients in a large ward
 ten private rooms.

The hospital grounds also had a secondary structure for doing laundry.

Brooklyn Women's Hospital
Brooklyn Hebrew Maternity Hospital closed; the 1395 Eastern Parkway building served as Brooklyn Women's Hospital August 1, 1930 through 1960s.

References

External links
 1930 census. Institution(s): Brooklyn Hebrew Maternity Hospital

  

Defunct hospitals in Brooklyn
Women in New York City
Maternity hospitals in the United States